The 1937 Army Cadets football team represented the United States Military Academy in the 1937 college football season. In their fifth and final year under head coach Garrison H. Davidson, the Cadets compiled a 7–2 record and outscored their opponents by a combined total of 176 to 72.  In the annual Army–Navy Game, the Cadets defeated the Midshipmen by a 6 to 0 score. The Cadets' two losses came against Yale and Notre Dame. 
 
No Army players were recognized on the 1937 College Football All-America Team.

Schedule

References

Army
Army Black Knights football seasons
Army Cadets football